I'm The J57 is the first full-length solo studio album of American rapper and music producer J57. With major music production credits from J57, the album was released on January 19, 2016, through FiveSeven Music. Preceding the album's release were singles "Soarin' Like Jordan" which featured vocal appearances from Archie Bang and The Audible Doctor, "Impatient" featuring Tiffany Topol, "Burn The Empires" featuring DeeJay Element, Tenacity, Sean Boog and Mean Joe Scheme and "Jon Bellion 4 Prez", a song he released as a tribute to Jon Bellion.

Critical reception

I'm The J57 was generally received to positive reviews from music critics and enthusiasts alike. Michael Cook of HYPEFRESH Magazine gave the album 8 stars out of 10 stating that: “The message behind the music is what makes this album an exclusive. Absent of sweet nothings and mind numbing lyrics, J57 proves that music can empower and uplift. His lyrical content and production is superb”. In the same vein The Over Grown's KC Orcutt, a music critic and columnist gave the album a positive review while describing the album and its lyrical content as an album "for dreamers, for fighters and for artists".

Track listing

Notes

Outro by Nana Rose and Momma57
Outro reading and words by Khaleesi
Chorus written by Mike Two with extra vocals by Nichelle
Intro reading and words by Joe "The Grand Concourse" Rogers
Extra vocals by Akie Bermiss
"Numb" was produced by Sean Bamberger while "Gaslighting" was produced by Sene
Outro by Post Office Mike
Cuts by DeeJay Element
Extra vocals by Akie Bermiss

Credits and personnel

James "J57" Heinz - Main artist, producer, writer
Sene - Producer
LuvJonez - Producer
Sean Bamberger - Producer
Tiffany Topol - Featured artist
Keith "Koncept" Whitehead - Featured artist
Akie Bermiss - Featured artist, additional vocals
Mike Two - Featured artist, writer
Mark "The Audible Doctor" Woodford - Featured artist
Archie Bang - Featured artist
Joseph "DeeJay Element" Montana - Featured artist, cuts
Katiah - Featured artist
Matt Stamm - Featured artist
Charles Chaio - Featured artist
F. Virtue - Featured artist
Thom Seveer - Featured artist
Jesse Mechanic - Featured artist
Nichelle - Featured artist, additional vocals

Release history

References

2016 albums
J57 albums
Albums produced by J57